Kondor (also Romanized as Kundar; also known as Kandel) is a village in Fasharud Rural District, in the Central District of Birjand County, South Khorasan Province, Iran. At the 2006 census, its population was 155, in 56 families.

References 

Populated places in Birjand County